The power law scheme was first used by Suhas Patankar (1980). It helps in achieving approximate solutions in computational fluid dynamics (CFD) and it is used for giving a more accurate approximation to the one-dimensional exact solution when compared to other schemes in computational fluid dynamics (CFD). This scheme is based on the analytical solution of the convection diffusion equation. This scheme is also very effective in removing False diffusion error.

Working 
The power-law scheme interpolates the face value of a variable, using the exact solution to a one-dimensional convection-diffusion equation given below:

In the above equation  Diffusion Coefficient,   and both the density  and velocity remains constant u across the interval of integration.

Integrating the equation, with Boundary Conditions,

Variation of face value with distance, x is given by the expression,

where Pe is the Peclet number given by

Peclet number is defined to be the ratio of the rate of convection of a physical quantity by the flow to the rate of diffusion of the same quantity driven by an appropriate gradient.

In this scheme diffusion is set to zero when cell Pe exceeds 10.

This implies that when the flow is dominated by convection, interpolation can be completed by simply letting the face value of a variable be set equal to its upwind or upstream value.

When Pe=0 (no flow, or pure diffusion), Figure shows that solution,  may be interpolated using a simple linear average between the values at x=0 and x=L. 

The simple average convection coefficient formulation can be replaced with a formula incorporating the power law relationship : 

where 

Final coefficient form of the discrete equation:

References

Computational fluid dynamics